Akram Tawfik Mohamed Hassan Elhagrasi (born 8 November 1997) is an Egyptian professional footballer who plays as a right-back or a defensive midfielder for Al Ahly.

He is a product of the ENPPI youth system. Akram is the younger brother of Abdelaziz Tawfik and Ahmed Tawfik, Egyptian international footballers.

Career statistics
Last updated on September 19, 2021

Club

International goal

Honours
Al Ahly
 Egyptian Premier League: 2016–17, 2017–18, 2018–19
 Egypt Cup: 2016–17 , 2019–20
 Egyptian Super Cup: 2021–22
 CAF Champions League: 2020–21
 CAF Super Cup: 2021 (May), 2021 (December)
 FIFA Club World Cup: Third-Place 2020 FIFA Club World Cup

Egypt
Africa U-23 Cup of Nations: 2019

References

External links
 
 
 
 

1997 births
Al Ahly SC players
Living people
Egyptian footballers
Egyptian Premier League players
ENPPI SC players
El Gouna FC players
Egypt international footballers
Footballers from Cairo
Association football midfielders
Footballers at the 2020 Summer Olympics
Olympic footballers of Egypt
2021 Africa Cup of Nations players